Aleksandr Vladimirovich Kukanos (born 30 May 1985) is a former Russian footballer.

Club career
He made his Russian Football National League debut for FC Alania Vladikavkaz on 28 March 2007 in a game against FC SKA-Energiya Khabarovsk.

External links

References

1985 births
Footballers from Moscow
Living people
Russian footballers
Association football defenders
FC Dynamo Moscow reserves players
FC Spartak Vladikavkaz players
FC KAMAZ Naberezhnye Chelny players
FC Rotor Volgograd players
FC Baltika Kaliningrad players
Skonto FC players
FC Khimki players
FC Rubin Kazan players
Russian expatriate footballers
Expatriate footballers in Latvia
Russian expatriate sportspeople in Latvia
Latvian Higher League players